Saxifraga spathularis, the St Patrick's cabbage, is a species of saxifrage native to Ireland, Portugal,  and Spain. It is a member of the so-called Lusitanian flora, a small set of plants which are native to Ireland but inexplicably absent from Great Britain. It consists of a basal rosette of elongate obovate succulent leaves around an upright leafless flowering stem. It seems to grow best in humus-rich alpine habitats among acidic rocks. With Saxifraga umbrosa it is a parent of Saxifraga × urbium (London pride).

References

External links
Saxifraga spathularis

spathularis
Flora of Ireland
Flora of Portugal
Flora of Spain
Plants described in 1805